Lipton is a village in the Canadian province of Saskatchewan within the Rural Municipality of Lipton No. 217 and Census Division No. 6.

History 
Lipton incorporated as a village on May 15, 1905.

Climate

Demographics 

See also
 List of communities in Saskatchewan
 Villages of Saskatchewan
 Jewish Colonization Association § History

References

Villages in Saskatchewan
Lipton No. 217, Saskatchewan
Division No. 6, Saskatchewan